Al-Thaʿlabi (Abū Isḥāḳ Aḥmad ibn Muḥammad ibn Ibrāhīm al-Nīsābūrī al-Thaʿlabī ; died November 1035) was an eleventh-century Islamic scholar of Persian origin.

He was accorded a high rank by Sunni scholars. In Tabaqat al-Kubra of Volume 3 page 23 the appraisal of Thalabi is as follows:

Works
Al-Thaʿlabī is known for two works: the Tafsir al-Thalabi and a book on the stories of the prophets, ʿArāʾis al-madjālis fī ḳiṣaṣ al-anbiyāʾ. The latter has been characterised as 'a work of popular imagination designed for education and entertainment. Organised according to the historical sequence of the prophets, many of the accounts are elaborations from the same sources used by al-Ṭabarī ... It has become the standard source of Islamic prophet stories, alongside the work of al-Kisāʾī'. Unlike al-Thaʿlabī's Tafsīr, this has been printed many times.

See also
List of Islamic scholars

References

1030s deaths
Year of birth unknown
Quranic exegesis scholars
People from Nishapur
Iranian scholars
11th-century jurists
11th-century Iranian people